Rene Sain (born 23 April 1997) is a Croatian volleyball player. She plays as libero for German club VC Wiesbaden.

International career 
She is a member of the Croatia women's national volleyball team. She competed at the 2017 FIVB Volleyball World Grand Prix, and 2021 Women's European Volleyball League, winning a silver medal.

References

External links
Rene Sain at CEV.eu

1997 births
Living people
Croatian women's volleyball players
Expatriate volleyball players in the Czech Republic
Expatriate volleyball players in Germany
Expatriate volleyball players in Romania
Expatriate volleyball players in France
Sportspeople from Pula
Mediterranean Games medalists in volleyball
Mediterranean Games gold medalists for Croatia
Competitors at the 2018 Mediterranean Games
21st-century Croatian women